Bryan Gerald McSheffrey (born September 25, 1952) is a Canadian former professional ice hockey forward. He was drafted in the second round, 19th overall, by the Vancouver Canucks in the 1972 NHL Amateur Draft. He played in the National Hockey League with the Canucks and Buffalo Sabres between 1972 and 1974.

In his NHL career, McSheffrey appeared in 90 games. He scored thirteen goals and added seven assists. He finished his professional career by playing two seasons in the Netherlands, where he scored 58 goals and added 66 assists in 38 games with HYS Intervam.

Career statistics

Regular season and playoffs

References

External links
 

1952 births
Living people
Buffalo Norsemen players
Buffalo Sabres players
Canadian expatriate sportspeople in the Netherlands
Canadian ice hockey right wingers
Cape Codders players
Hershey Bears players
HYS The Hague players
Ice hockey people from Ottawa
Long Beach Sharks players
Mohawk Valley Comets (NAHL) players
Ottawa 67's players
Seattle Totems (WHL) players
Vancouver Canucks draft picks
Vancouver Canucks players